Andreas Schmidt (born 14 September 1973 in Berlin) is a German former professional footballer who spent his entire career with Hertha BSC. His twin brother, Oliver, also played for Hertha.

Honours
Hertha Berlin
DFL-Ligapokal: 2002

References

External links
 

1973 births
Living people
German footballers
German twins
Footballers from Berlin
Association football midfielders
Bundesliga players
Hertha BSC players
Hertha BSC II players
Germany under-21 international footballers
Germany B international footballers
Twin sportspeople
West German footballers